John O'Connell (22 April 1951 – 5 November 1989) was an Australian rules footballer who played for Carlton in the VFL during the 1970s.

O'Connell made his way into the Carlton side after playing underage football for the club. Although originally a centreman and ruck-rover, he was used as a defender when joined the seniors in 1970. He played most of his games in the back pocket and was a long kick of the ball. O'Connell was a member of Carlton's 1972 premiership team and also played in the side which lost the Grand Final the following season. In the 1973 decider he had been a replacement for the ill Barry Armstrong and was given the role of tagging Richmond star Ian Stewart.

References

Blueseum Biography: John O'Connell
Holmesby, Russell and Main, Jim (2007). The Encyclopedia of AFL Footballers. 7th ed. Melbourne: Bas Publishing.

1951 births
1989 deaths
Australian rules footballers from Victoria (Australia)
Carlton Football Club players
Carlton Football Club Premiership players
Subiaco Football Club players
Deaths from cancer in Victoria (Australia)
One-time VFL/AFL Premiership players